The 2009 New York Sentinels season was the first and only season for the New York Sentinels. In the United Football League's Premiere Season, the Sentinels went winless by posting a 0–6 record, finishing in fourth place.

Draft

The draft took place on June 19, 2009. Those selected were among participants in earlier workouts held in Orlando as well as Las Vegas. Once a player was picked by a team, his rights were held by that team should he elect to play in the UFL.

Personnel

Staff

Roster

Schedule

Standings

Game summaries

Week 1: at Florida Tuskers

Week 2: at California Redwoods

Week 4: vs. California Redwoods

Week 5: vs. Las Vegas Locomotives

Week 6: vs. Florida Tuskers

Week 7: at Las Vegas Locomotives

Notes

New York Sentinels Season, 2009
New York Sentinels seasons
New York Sentinels
New York Sentinels
New York Sentinels